The Toricella Hospital (Italian Ospedale dei Santi Filippo e Jacopo or Spedale della Torricella) was a hospital in Florence. It is first documented early in the 15th century and was funded by the Compagnia di San Niccolò. The nuns of San Miniato moved there sometime between 1500 and 1550, but moved out after the 1557 flood, handing the hospital over to the monks of the Florence Charterhouse.

Hospitals in Florence